Deio ab Ieuan Du (fl. 1460–1480) was a Welsh language poet from Ceredigion, west Wales.

Deio composed eulogies to the nobility of the area, including Gruffydd Fychan, a supporter of Jasper Tudor.

His works were edited in 1992 by A. Eleri Davies along with those of Gwilym ab Ieuan Hen.

See also

Deio ab Ieuan Du at Wikisource

Bibliography
A. Eleri Davies (ed.), Gwaith Deio ab Ieuan Du a Gwilym ab Ieuan Hen (University of Wales Press, 1992)

Welsh-language poets
15th-century Welsh poets